This is a list of records and statistics of the CONCACAF Gold Cup. The Gold Cup replaced the CONCACAF Championship, which was held ten times from 1963 to 1989.

Debut of teams
Each final tournament has had at least one team appearing for the first time. A total of 23 CONCACAF members have reached the finals.

Overall team records
In this ranking 3 points are awarded for a win, 1 for a draw and 0 for a loss. As per statistical convention in football, matches decided in extra time are counted as wins and losses, while matches decided by penalty shoot-outs are counted as draws. Teams are ranked by total points, then by goal difference, then by goals scored.

Notes

Medal table

Comprehensive team results by tournament
Legend
 – Champions
 – Runners-up
 – Third place
 – Fourth place
 – Semi-finals
 – Quarter-finals
GS – Group stage
Q – Qualified for upcoming tournament
 – Did not qualify
 – Disqualified
 – Did not enter / Withdrew / Banned
 – Hosts

For each tournament, the number of teams in each finals tournament are shown (in parentheses). 

Notes

Invitees nations record

General statistics by tournament

Teams yet to qualify for finals

The following eighteen teams which are current CONCACAF members have never qualified for the Gold Cup.

Legend
 – Did not qualify
 – Did not enter / withdrew / banned

For each tournament, the number of teams in each finals tournament (in brackets) are shown.

Host nations and venues

 Co-hosted by the United States and Mexico in 1993 and 2003
 Co-hosted by the United States and Canada in 2015
 Co-hosted by the United States, Costa Rica and Jamaica in 2019

Results of host nations and defending champions

Active participation streaks
This is a list of active consecutive participations of national teams in the CONCACAF Gold Cups.

Active participation droughts
This is a list of droughts associated with the participation of national teams in the CONCACAF Gold Cup.
Does not include teams that have not yet made their first appearance, teams that no longer exist.

Player awards and records

Top 20 goal leaders 

 Only CONCACAF Gold Cup matches counted towards all-time records. Stats from qualification are not included.
 Players in bold have not retired from international football and may still be called up to their national team.

Best goalkeeper award 

 2000:  Craig Forrest
 2002:  Lars Hirschfeld
 2003:  Oswaldo Sánchez
 2005:  Jaime Penedo
 2007:  Franck Grandel
 2009:  Keylor Navas
 2011:  Noel Valladares
 2013:  Jaime Penedo
 2015:  Brad Guzan
 2017:  Andre Blake
 2019:  Guillermo Ochoa
 2021:  Matt Turner

References 

 
All-time football league tables